Serge Tabekou (born 15 October 1996) is a Cameroonian footballer who plays for Lierse Kempenzonen as a forward.

Club career
Tabekou started his professional career in Cameroon with APEJES Academy but moved to Gent in January 2015. After having only trained twice with the main squad and while still being unknown to the fans and most players, he was brought on as a substitute in the final fifteen minutes and scored a goal just before the end of the match to help his team win 3–1 away to Standard Liège.

International career
Tabekou made his debut with the Cameroon national team in a friendly 0-0 tie with Japan on 9 October 2020.

Honours
Gent
Belgian Super Cup: 2015

References

External links
 
 
 

1996 births
Living people
Footballers from Yaoundé
Cameroonian footballers
Cameroon international footballers
Association football forwards
APEJES Academy players
K.A.A. Gent players
CS Sedan Ardennes players
Oud-Heverlee Leuven players
Royale Union Saint-Gilloise players
Royal Excel Mouscron players
Manisa FK footballers
Lierse Kempenzonen players
Belgian Pro League players
Challenger Pro League players
Cameroonian expatriate footballers
Expatriate footballers in Belgium
Expatriate footballers in France
Expatriate footballers in Turkey